Landtag elections in the Republic of Baden (Republik Baden) during the Weimar Republic were held on four occasions  between 1919 and 1929. Results with regard to the percentage of the vote won and the number of seats allocated to each party are presented in the tables below. On 31 March 1933, the sitting Landtag was dissolved by the Nazi-controlled central government and reconstituted to reflect the distribution of seats in the national Reichstag. The Landtag subsequently was formally abolished as a result of the "Law on the Reconstruction of the Reich" of 30 January 1934 which replaced the German federal system with a unitary state.

1919
The 1919 Baden state election was held on 5 January 1919 to elect 107 members of the National Constituent Assembly.

1921
The 1921 Baden state election was held on 30 October 1921 to elect the 86 members of the Landtag.

1925
The 1925 Baden state election was held on 25 October 1925 to elect the 72 members of the Landtag.

1929
The 1929 Baden state election was held on 27 October 1929 to elect the 88 members of the Landtag.

See also
 Landtag of the Republic of Baden

References

Elections in the Weimar Republic
Elections in Baden-Württemberg
Bavaria
Bavaria
Bavaria
Bavaria